is a 2000 Japanese tokusatsu television series created and directed by Keita Amemiya, written by Toshiki Inoue, and distributed by Media Factory. The series aired on Fuji TV from October 23, 2000, to March 24, 2001, although only for six episodes, and has since been released in a DVD box set on February 5, 2010.

References

Tokusatsu television series
2000 Japanese television series debuts
2001 Japanese television series endings
Fuji TV original programming